The 2008–09 Atlantic 10 Conference men's basketball season marked the 33rd season of Atlantic 10 Conference basketball.

Preseason
Xavier University was seen as the favourite to win the league by coaches and media in the preseason poll after having won the regular season the two previous years and also reaching the Elite Eight of the NCAA tournament.

No A-10 side was in either the AP Poll or the ESPN/USA Today Coaches' poll top 25, Xavier dropping out from last season in 26th and 30th place respectively after losing 3 starters in the offseason, the university was in the lesser Sporting News Top 40 at 19th along with Saint Joseph's at 32nd and Temple at 38th.

The Musketeers' Derrick Brown along with the Owl's Dionte Christmas were named to the John R. Wooden Award preseason top 50 candidate list in November. 
Brown was also named to the Naismith Award watch list on December 18.   
Another individual award, the Lowe's Senior CLASS Award selected Christmas and Jimmy Baron of Rhode Island on their 30-man preseason candidate list.

It was speculated if Christmas would be the first player in league history to lead the A-10 in scoring three seasons in a row whilst Ahmad Nivins of Saint Joseph's and Chris Lowe of Massachusetts also aimed to lead the conference for the third time, in field goal percentage and assists respectively.

Atlantic 10 Preseason Poll

First-place votes in parentheses

Preseason All-A10 Team
First Team
 Derrick Brown, Xavier
 Dionte Christmas, Temple
 Kevin Lisch, Saint Louis
 Chris Lowe, Massachusetts
 Ahmad Nivins, Saint Joseph's

Second Team
 Rob Diggs, George Washington
 Ricky Harris, Massachusetts
 Tommie Liddell, Saint Louis
 Lamont Mack, Charlotte
 Chris Wright, Dayton

Third Team
 C. J. Anderson, Xavier
 Kevin Anderson, Richmond
 Jimmy Baron, Rhode Island
 Rodney Green, La Salle
 David Gonzalvez, Richmond

Preseason A10 All-Rookie Team

 Melquan Bolding, Duquesne
 Kenny Frease, Xavier
 Terrell Holloway, Xavier
 Mark Lyons, Xavier
 Paul Williams, Dayton

Preseason A10 All-Defensive Team
 Lavoy Allen, Temple
 Derrick Brown, Xavier
 Kevin Lisch, Saint Louis
 Chris Lowe, Massachusetts
 Garrett Williamson, Saint Joseph’s

Regular season

Xavier captured its third consecutive Atlantic 10 regular season crown with a 12-4 record
in Conference play, it had been undefeated in conference play until four late-season losses to Duquesne, Dayton, Charlotte, and Richmond. The last A-10 program to enter the tournament as #1 seed thrice in a row was Temple in 1998-00.
It moved the university into the top 25 in the national rankings (see below) of both the AP Poll (17th) and the ESPN/USA Today poll (18th).

On individual records, Temple's Dionte Christmas entered tournament play tied with Player of the Year Ahmad Nivins at 19.2 ppg in his quest to lead the conference in scoring for a record third consecutive time.
Nivins' 62.5% put him in the driving seat to equal Alexander Koul's record in 1995-97 as the only players in A-10 history to lead the league in field goal percentage three consecutive years.
They would both achieve these feats in post-season, Christmas with 19.5 ppg and Nivins with 61.2%, Massachusetts' Chris Lowe finished second in his similar pursuit of assists leading.

Postseason

Atlantic 10 Tournament

All the games were held at the Boardwalk Hall in Atlantic City.

Conference awards and honors

Weekly awards
Atlantic 10 Players of the Week
Throughout the conference season, the Atlantic 10 offices name a player and rookie of the week.

All-Conference Awards 
 Player of the Year: Ahmad Nivins, Saint Joseph's
 Rookie of the Year: Andrew Nicholson, St. Bonaventure
 Defensive Player of the Year: Tony Gaffney, Massachusetts
 Chris Daniels Most Improved Player of the Year: Aaron Jackson, Duquesne
 Sixth Man of the Year: Delroy James, Rhode Island
 Student-Athlete of the Year: Kevin Lisch, Saint Louis
 Coach of the Year:  Jim Baron, Rhode Island

Atlantic 10 Men's Basketball All-Conference Teams
First Team
 Jimmy Baron, Rhode Island
 Dionte Christmas, Temple
 Aaron Jackson, Duquesne
 Ahmad Nivins, Saint Joseph's
 B.J. Raymond, Xavier

Second Team
 Kevin Anderson, Richmond
 Derrick Brown, Xavier
 Tony Gaffney, Massachusetts
 Rodney Green, La Salle
 Chris Wright, Dayton

Third Team
 Lavoy Allen, Temple
 Ricky Harris, Massachusetts
 Kevin Lisch, Saint Louis
 Lamont Mack, Charlotte
 Kahiem Seawright, Rhode Island

Honorable Mention
 C.J. Anderson, Xavier
 David Gonzalvez, Richmond
 Marcus Johnson, Dayton
 Chris Lowe, Massachusetts
 Damian Saunders, Duquesne

Rookie Team
 Melquan Bolding, Duquesne
 Jio Fontan, Fordham
 Chris Johnson, Dayton
 Kwamain Mitchell, Saint Louis
 Andrew Nicholson, St. Bonaventure

Defensive Team
 Lavoy Allen, Temple
 Tony Gaffney, Massachusetts
 Ahmad Nivins, Saint Joseph's
 London Warren, Dayton
 Garrett Williamson, Saint Joseph’s

Academic Team
 Jimmy Baron, Rhode Island
 Luke Bonner, Massachusetts
 Jason Duty, Duquesne
 Will Martell, Rhode Island
 Yves Mekongo Mbala, La Salle

Rankings

Post Tournament Results

NCAA tournament

Xavier (2-1) : Regional semifinals (Sweet Sixteen)

Dayton (1-1): Regional second round

Temple (0-1): Regional first round

National Invitation Tournament

Rhode Island (1-1): Second Round

Duquesne (0-1): First round

College Basketball Invitational

Richmond (2-1): Semifinal

References

External links
"Men's Basketball - Archives 2008-09", Atlantic 10 Conference. Retrieved on 18 April 2015.
"2009-10 A-10 season prospectus (review of 2008-09)", CBS Sports Network. Retrieved on 18 April 2015.